A partial lunar eclipse took place on Saturday, July 4, 1936.

This event followed the total solar eclipse of June 19, 1936.

Visibility

Related lunar eclipses

Half-Saros cycle
A lunar eclipse will be preceded and followed by solar eclipses by 9 years and 5.5 days (a half saros). This lunar eclipse is related to two total solar eclipses of Solar Saros 145.

See also
 List of lunar eclipses
 List of 20th-century lunar eclipses

Notes

External links
 

1936-07
1936 in science